Maui Bus is the public transportation service of the island of Maui, Hawaii, and is operated by Roberts Hawaii under a public-private partnership with Maui County government. They operate 13 regular local bus routes and 4 commuter routes, which have a single early morning run and a return trip in the afternoon and require a reservation.

History
The first public transit service on Maui started in 1992 with two loop routes in Central Maui operated by the non-profit organization Maui Economic Opportunity (MEO). These were operated over the same route in opposite directions, offered free of charge with a suggested donation.

The Maui Bus service was started as the Holo Kaa service in August 2002 with a joint venture between the private company Akina Aloha Tours, MEO, and the county government in a subsidized joint venture to provide bus service for South, West, and Central Maui.  Low ridership (blamed on the lack of advertising for the system) led to Akina Aloha Tours losing $1 million over the following two years.

Service was reduced in July 2004 to five transit routes: three operated by Roberts Hawaii, one by Akina Aloha Tours (privately financed), and the one bidirectional route by MEO. The Roberts routes were named Routes A, B, and C: Route A operated between Maalea Harbor Village and the Shops at Wailea via Kihei [which is now Route #15]; Route B connected Kahului to Wharf Cinema Center (in Lahaina) via Maalea [now Route #20]; and Route C connected the Queen Kaahumanu Center with the Shops at Wailea [now Route #10]. The MEO routes served Central Maui (Wailuku and Kahului) with a loop route operated in opposite directions [now Routes #1/2 and #5/6]. The Akina Aloha route operated between Kaanapali and Lahaina [now Route #28].

The Short Range Transit Plan (SRTP) published in January 2005 evaluated contemporary demand and service conditions and developed the current fixed routes, including the expansion of service to Upcountry Maui. The 2005 SRTP also developed the branding and logo of Maui Bus, which began operations in 2006; the fixed and commuter routes are operated by Roberts Hawaii, while the paratransit services are operated by MEO. Ridership rose sharply over the ten years between 2002 and 2012, from less than 200,000 (annual passengers) to more than 2,500,000.

Service
The current Maui Bus service includes 13 fixed routes, 4 commuter routes, and a paratransit program that provides curb-to-curb service with advance reservations, serving western, central, and southern communities, including Wailuku, Kahului, Lahaina, Haiku, Kula, and Upcountry Maui.

Fixed routes
The Central Maui System includes the routes numbered with a single digit. The (southern) Kihei Route System includes routes numbered in the 10s. The (western) Lahaina, Kaanapali and Napili Route System includes routes numbered in the 20s. The Upcountry Route System includes routes numbered in the 30s, including #40. On average, 6,500 passengers board the Maui Bus fixed-route system, with an average per-passenger trip cost of $2.47.

For fixed-route service, Loop services operate within Central Maui, Villager services are routes that circulate within a single community (Lahaina, Kihei, and Kula), and Islander services are longer routes that connect different communities to Central Maui. Most of the Islander routes connect at a privately-owned site at the Queen Kaʻahumanu Center shopping mall in Kahului, where transfers can be made to other Islander routes or the local Loop/Villager routes. Other significant transfer and boarding sites include Wharf Cinema Center, Whalers Village, Piilani Village Shopping Center, and War Memorial Stadium. The War Memorial Stadium site is used as a park-and-ride or drop-off location for three of the four commuter routes.

Both the Kahului and Wailuku Loops are bidirectionally operated over the same routes: #1 (Wailuku Loop) and #6 (Kahului) operate clockwise, while #2 (Waikluki) and #5 (Kahului) operate counter-clockwise. Officially, #2 and #6 are the reverse routes.

Commuter routes
Commuter routes are named for the termini, listed in order of morning origin and destination, respectively. For the afternoon commute, the route is reversed. Three of the four commuter routes meet in Wailuku at War Memorial Stadium. Three of the four bring commuters to the Kapalua/Napili/Kaanapali area in the morning. Only one commuter route operates more than once per day.

During the COVID-19 pandemic, commuter service was reduced in response to a decrease in ridership.

Notes

Former and proposed fixed routes
Neither of the fixed-route loops in Central Maui serve Kahului Airport, and the long headways on the two Upcountry routes that do (#35 and #40) led to the recommendation to add direct service between Wailuku and the airport.

Notes

Fleet

Fares
Cash fares are $2.00 per person per boarding. No transfers are given, but a day pass, at $4.00 per person, is valid on all routes. An all-route monthly pass is available at a cost of $45.00, with a reduced rate for students and seniors of $30.00.

Facilities
Because the County of Maui uses contracted operators for the Maui Bus service, the County-owned buses are operated and maintained by its contractors and the Maui Department of Transportation does not have a dedicated facility to store, refuel, and maintain the buses. However, in 2013, the County purchased an undeveloped  site in Waikapu with plans to consolidate existing garage and yard facilities for other County departments with a new bus yard. The proposed bus yard would be a  parcel at Waikapu, to be operated by a single private contractor, with space to park 100 buses (expandable to 150) and five to ten maintenance bays. The site lies east of a proposed extension to Waiale Road, west of Kuihelani Highway.

The existing fixed-route services use Queen Kaahumanu Center (QKC) as a hub and transfer point; the privately-owned shopping center notified the County of Maui in 2017 that it would not renew its lease and the buses would be forced to vacate the site by 2020. Plans are underway to develop a  site next to QKC, near the Kahului Public Library at Vevau and School, as the Central Maui Transit Hub.

MEO operates a transportation facility in Puunene.

References

External links

County of Maui official page

2002 establishments in Hawaii
Bus transportation in Hawaii
Transit agencies in Hawaii
Transportation in Maui County, Hawaii